Hatiasuli is a small village located in the Jamboni CD block in the Jhargram subdivision of the Jhargram district in the state of West Bengal, India.

The village has an area of 204.7 hectares and as at 2011 a population of 881.

References

Villages in Jhargram district